Maurice Long (15 March 1866 – 15 January 1923) was a French politician. A député for Drôme, he was briefly a Minister of Supply under the government of Paul Painlevé in 1917 and the Governor-General of French Indochina from 13 December 1919 until his death.

Biography
Maurice Long was born on 15 March 1866 in Crest, Drôme. From 8 May 1910 until his death, he represented his home department in the Chamber of Deputies as a member of the Radical-Socialist Party. During World War I, Long was the Minister of Supply for the cabinet of Paul Painlevé from 12 September to 17 November 1917. On 13 December 1917, Long was appointed Governor-General of French Indochina, a position he held until his death.

Death and legacy
At the age of 57, Maurice Long died in Colombo, Ceylon on 15 January 1923 while returning to Indochina after a stay in France.

The Musée Maurice Long, a former commercial and industrial museum in Hanoi, was named after the late Governor-General. On 1 May 1938, at the museum, "a meeting of many thousands of Hanoi workers demanded 'freedom, democracy, the right to organise trade unions, the improvement of the quality of life', a key event in the build-up to the First Indochina War against the French."

See also
French Third Republic

References

External links
Database of French deputies since 1789 (Assemblee Nationale)

20th-century French politicians

1866 births
1923 deaths